Chayilyam is a 2014 Indian Malayalam-language film written and directed by Manoj Kana. The story is about  the plight of a hapless widow, who is denied the freedom to lead a normal life by the society. The film was produced with contributions from more than 2,000 individuals and released in theatres in February 2014. This film received a positive response at film festivals.

Cast
 Anumol as Gowry
 M. R. Gopakumar

Awards
 Hassan Kutty Award for Best Debut Indian Film at the International Film Festival of Kerala (2012)
 Kerala State Film Award for Best Story (2012)
 Padmarajan Award for Best Film (2012)

References

External links

2010s Malayalam-language films
2014 films
Films scored by Chandran Veyattummal